Charles Cambier (5 January 1884 – 16 October 1955) was a Belgian football player who played his whole career for Club Brugge.

Cambier also played for the Belgium national football team, scoring 3 goals for 23 caps.

References

External links
 

1884 births
1955 deaths
Belgian footballers
Belgium international footballers
Club Brugge KV players
Belgian Pro League players
Footballers from Bruges

Association football midfielders